Acacia pycnocephala is a shrub of the genus Acacia and the subgenus Phyllodineae that is endemic to south western Australia.

Description
Like most species of Acacia it has phyllodes rather than true leaves. It blooms from May to September and produces yellow flowers. The simple inflorescences simple occur singly in the axils and have spherical flower heads containing four golden coloured flowers. The striated pods are a red-brown colour and have small hairs.

Taxonomy
The shrub belongs to the Acacia horridula group of wattles.

Distribution
It is native to an area in the Wheatbelt, Great Southern, South West and Goldfields-Esperance regions of Western Australia where it is found growing in sandy or loamy soils derived or containing laterite. The range of the plant extends from around Narrogin in the north west to Rocky Gully in the south west out to Beaufort Inlet in the south east and Lake King in the north east as a part of many communities but most often in Mallee shrubland or open Eucalyptus wandoo woodlands.

See also
 List of Acacia species

References

pycnocephala
Acacias of Western Australia
Taxa named by Bruce Maslin
Plants described in 1978